Starović is a Serbian surname. Notable people with the surname include:

Milica Starović (born 1988), Serbian sprint canoer
Sanja Starović (born 1983), Serbian volleyball player
Saša Starović (born 1988), Serbian volleyball player, brother of Sanja

Serbian surnames